Hanshan South railway station is a railway station in Hanshan County, Ma'anshan, Anhui, China.

It opened with the second section of the Shangqiu–Hangzhou high-speed railway on 28 June 2020.

References

Railway stations in China opened in 2020
Railway stations in Anhui